Mauchline Football Club was a senior football team based in the small town of Mauchline in East Ayrshire.

History

The club was founded in 1873 and played their homes matches at Connel Park. The senior club dissolved in 1897 but adopted junior status as Mauchline Thistle Football Club, which itself disbanded just seven years later.

Mauchline was an original member of two ill-fated leagues who survived for just one season, The Ayrshire Football League for the 1891–92 season and the original South of Scotland Football League in 1892–93.

However, Mauchline were better known as a cup team, appearing in every Scottish Cup from 1875–76 to 1885–86, and often reaching the later rounds. In 1877–78 they reached the quarter-finals only to lose 1–3 away to the eventual winners, Renton.  That same year they beat Kilmarnock Portland 4–2 to win the inaugural Ayrshire Cup.

A second Mauchline Football Club was founded in 1911 and existed until 1922 although all competitions were suspended throughout the First World War, 1914–1918.

Colours

The club played in blue and white striped shirts and white shorts, until 1885, when those colours were described as "old" colours, being worn against Hurlford F.C. in a Cup match; the context suggests both clubs had changed from their blue shirts.

Notable players
Dr John Smith gained four of his ten Scottish caps whilst a Mauchline player, scoring three goals; he was the sole club representative to have been selected for international duty.

References

Sources
Pagan, Malcolm. Senior Non League Football in South West Scotland, Stewart Davidson, Paisley, Scotland, 1996.

Defunct football clubs in Scotland
Association football clubs established in 1873
Association football clubs disestablished in 1897
1897 disestablishments in Scotland
1873 establishments in Scotland
South of Scotland Football League teams
Football in East Ayrshire
Mauchline